is a Japanese samurai family which descended from the Seiwa Genji.

History
The clan traces its history from Minamoto no Yoshiie through his son Minamoto no Yoshitoki.

The Ishikawa district of Kawachi Province is named after them. In the Sengoku Period, the family had two major branches; one of them, which had settled in Mikawa Province in the 15th century, was a family of retainers serving what became the Tokugawa clan. Ishikawa Kazumasa, one of Tokugawa Ieyasu's senior retainers, was famous in his era for suddenly leaving Tokugawa service and pledging loyalty to Toyotomi Hideyoshi. However, as Kazumasa's son Yasunaga became implicated in the Ōkubo Yasunaga incident, his branch of the Ishikawa of Mikawa came to an end then. The Mikawa-Ishikawa line continued through Kazumasa's uncle Ienari, Ienari's descendants eventually came to rule the Ise-Kameyama Domain for most of the Edo period.

The other branch of the family, which had established itself in Kawachi Province, was the ancestor of the Nakagawa clan, which ruled the Oka Domain for the entirety of the Edo period.

Select list of clan members

 Ishikawa Yasumichi (1554–1607)  
 Ishikawa Tadafusa (1572–1650) 
 Ishikawa Kiyokane 
 Ishikawa Yasumasa 
 Ishikawa Yasunaga 
 Ishikawa Kazumasa
 Ishikawa Kazunori
 Ishikawa Tomoji (1900-1940)

References

External links
 石川氏 at Harimaya.com 

Japanese clans
Minamoto clan